Evelina Lopez Antonetty (1922−1984) was a civil rights activist who helped mainly Puerto Rican children with school environments and their education. Antonetty started the United Bronx Parents in South Bronx, New York which helped children in every way possible. It helped with bilingual classes, school lunches as well as increased community involvement. The work that Antonetty did played a large role in why schools across the United States now have bilingual education. While helping minorities in the Bronx area, Evelina left a big impact on the people and schools. When Antonetty died in 1984, she left legacy in education equality. As of 2016, United Bronx Parents remains active in school systems and has spread throughout the U.S. Antonetty was greatly recognized as an organized and strong leader.

Early life
Evelina Lopez Antonetty was born on September 19, 1922 into a poor family in Salinas, a small fishing village in Puerto Rico. She grew up as the eldest of three daughters. Her mother, Eva Cruz Lopez, sent her to live in New York with her aunt and uncle in 1933 when Antonetty was 11 years old. She went to public school in East Harlem, Wadleigh High School for Girls which was considered one of the best schools in the city. Her family moved around a lot within the Latino community. They were part of the working poor in Harlem but were relatively fortunate as Eva had a steady job. Her activism stemmed from her childhood of poverty growing up in Puerto Rico and then the exposition of the progressive politics of the Great Depression after her emigration to New York City. Her experience with rejection and discrimination in the public school district motivated her to reach out and want to help other children like her.

Career

In Antonetty’s teenage years, she worked for multiple political leaders, which is what drew her interest to political activism. She worked for Congressman Vito Marcantonio, an Italian-American man from Harlem, and Jesús Colón, a Puerto Rican born labor leader. With the experience of working for Marcantonio and Colón, she moved to South Bronx where she worked for District 65 of the United Auto Workers, preparing people to enter the job force. Once she married her second husband, Donato Antonetty, she decided to stay home and raise her three children while her husband worked. When her daughter Anita started school in 1962, she decided to join the school’s parents association, which eventually led to her creating the United Bronx Parents.

United Bronx Parents
Founded by Evelina Antonetty and established in 1965, the United Bronx Parents encouraged parents in the South Bronx community to become more involved in their children’s education. Within this program, it provided training sessions in order to better inform parents on the evaluations of schools regarding the types of teachers and the types of educational programs that schools had to offer. Evelina Antonetty hoped that the United Bronx Parents would be able to diminish the idea that minorities were not able to get an education because they were poor but due to inequality between races. In the late 1960s,  the goal of the program had altered to trying to increase bilingual education which in 1968 would make South Bronx the first to have bilingual schools. The United Bronx program originally set out to help Puerto Rican parents become more involved in the New York educational system. However, due to its success, it also led to the involvement of African American mothers as well as expanding to other cities within New York and throughout the country.

Legacy
In 2011, a mural was painted in the South Bronx honoring her work and dedication for the United Bronx Parents.

References

1922 births
1984 deaths
American civil rights activists
Activists for Hispanic and Latino American civil rights
People from Salinas, Puerto Rico
American people of Puerto Rican descent
Activists from New York City
Founders of charities